Valencia is a town located in northeastern Trinidad island,  in the Republic of Trinidad and Tobago.

It is administered by the Sangre Grande Regional Corporation.

References

Populated places in Trinidad and Tobago
Trinidad (island)